Vulsini, also known as Volsini volcano, Vulsini Volcanic District, Vulsini Volcanic Complex and the Vulsinian District, is a circular region of intrusive igneous rock in Lazio, Italy, about  to the north northwest of Rome, containing a cluster of calderas known to have been active in recent geologic times. The Vulsinian region is one of dozens of intrusive circular regions, most smaller than the Vulsinian, arranged in a band from Campania through Lazio, called the Roman Comagmatic Province. A comagmatic province is a geologic area of the same type and age igneous rock deriving from the same crustal magma. The Roman region is post-collisional; that is, the intrusions were not a result of the lateral stresses that created Italy and raised the Apennines, but were subsequent to Italy's creation. The Volsinian is the northernmost region.

An alleged eruption occurred in 104 BC, but it is currently considered a misinterpretation of the description of a fire, and the most recent confirmed activity occurred in Pleistocene. Vepe, to the north of Lake Mezzano (a very small crater lake west of Lake Bolsena) is what is known as a nested caldera; it arose in the previously existing Latera Caldera. Italian routes SS74 and SS312 follow the rim from Valentano through Latera westward, turning off before Mezzano on the other side. In addition the small Montefiascone caldera, also nested, lies between Montefiascone on its eastern rim and the lake. Two islands in the lake, Bisentina and Martana, were formed from airfall tuffs in Pompeii-like eruptions. Dozens of other tuff cones dot the region, mainly on the eastern side of the complex.

The Italian Civil Protection Department considers Vulsini as extinct.

Subfeatures

The following tuff cones stand out in the region:
 Monte Becco
 Isola Bisentina
 La Dogana
 Monte Evangelista, 
 Isola Martana
 Molino
 Montefiascone
 Monte Montione
 Valentano
 Monte Pilato
 Monte Rosso
 Santa Luce
 Santa Maria di Sala
 Selva del Lamone
 Monte Semonte
 Monte Spinaio
 Monte Bandinio

See also
 Monti Volsini

References

External links
 

Calderas of Italy
Potentially active volcanoes
Pleistocene calderas
Holocene calderas